Cheng Chi-hsiang (born 4 May 1949) is a Taiwanese judoka. He competed in the men's lightweight event at the 1972 Summer Olympics.

References

1949 births
Living people
Taiwanese male judoka
Olympic judoka of Taiwan
Judoka at the 1972 Summer Olympics
Place of birth missing (living people)